Miguel Muniesa is a Spanish film and theater actor.

He appeared in Companys, proceso a Cataluña (1979), Biotaxia (1968), The Exquisite Cadaver (1969), Ninguno de los tres se llamaba Trinidad (1973), and he played  Inspector Robert in Devil's Kiss (1976).

Filmography

References

External links
 

Date of birth missing
20th-century Spanish male actors
Spanish male film actors
Spanish male television actors
Spanish male stage actors
Male Spaghetti Western actors